Vakili may refer to:

Vakili, Iran, a village in Golestan Province, Iran
Monir Vakili (1923-1983), Iranian singer
Farhad Vakili, Iranian Kurdish activist
Anna Vakili
Vakili, Azerbaijan, Iran Governor of Ardebil Province 19th century